Karl Abt may refer to:

 Karl Friedrich Abt (1743–1783), German actor.
 Karl Abt (painter) (1899–1985), German painter 
 Karl Ferdinand Abt (1903–1945), German politician
Carl Roman Abt (1850–1933), Swiss engineer